Artyom Borodkin (born October 11, 1991) is a Russian professional ice hockey defenceman. He is currently playing with HC Vityaz in the Kontinental Hockey League (KHL).

Borodkin previously played the first eight professional seasons of his career with hometown club, Traktor Chelyabinsk of the KHL. On 3 May 2020, Borodkin left Traktor to sign a one-year contract as a free agent with HC Vityaz.

References

External links

1991 births
Living people
Russian ice hockey defencemen
Traktor Chelyabinsk players
HC Vityaz players